The Memphis Belles were a women's professional tackle football team and members of the Independent Women's Football League.  Based in Memphis, Tennessee, the Memphis Belles played their 2010 home games at  Halle Stadium football field in Memphis, Tennessee. At one point, in their fourth year of operation, the Memphis Belles were the longest-running women's tackle football team in Memphis history.

In their inaugural season (2008), the Memphis Belles played in the National Women's Football Association. When the NWFA folded in 2009, the Memphis Belles moved to the Women's Football Alliance. In 2010, the Memphis Belles moved to the Independent Women's Football League, the longest-running and most successful league in the history of Women's Professional Tackle Football, where they made the Midwest Divisional Playoffs. The team has since folded.

Season-by-season 

|-
| colspan="6" align="center" | Memphis Belles (NWFA)
|-
|2008 || 3 || 4 || 1 || 2nd South Midwest || --
|-
| colspan="6" align="center" | Memphis Belles (WFA)
|-
|2009 || 4 || 4 || 0 || 3rd American Southeast || --
|-
| colspan="6" align="center" | Memphis Belles (IWFL)
|-
|2010* || 1 || 1 || 0 || 1st West Midwest || --
|-
!Totals || 8 || 9 || 1
|colspan="2"| (including playoffs)

* = Current Standing

Season schedules

2009

2010

External links
 Memphis Belles official website

National Women's Football Association teams
Women's Football Alliance teams
Belles
American football teams established in 2008
Women's sports in Tennessee